Peter Whitaker  was an English actor who appeared as bar owner Jack Pomeroy in the first series of Rumpole of the Bailey. He is also known for playing the murdered police inspector Gascoigne in the Doctor Who serial The Faceless Ones, as well as appearing as a supporting extra in many other episodes of the series, including The Seeds of Death and The Pirate Planet. He also appeared in many other television series' such as Taxi!, The Forsyte Saga, Dad's Army, Upstairs, Downstairs and Blake's 7.

References

External links

English male television actors